John Blain may refer to:

 John Blain (cricketer) (born 1979), Scottish cricketer
 John Blain (Canadian football) (born 1955), football player

See also
John Blaine (disambiguation)